Vanuatu Post is the national post office of Vanuatu.  It runs the world's first underwater post office, which opened in 2003.

References

Communications in Vanuatu